During the 1991–92 English football season, Millwall F.C. competed in the Football League Second Division.

Season summary
In the 1991–92 season, Millwall were looking to challenge for automatic promotion but started the campaign poorly with 1 win from their first 7 league games which saw them in relegation zone near the end of September and even though their form slightly improved onwards, manager Rioch was sacked after a 6–1 defeat at Portsmouth and Mick McCarthy took over as player-manager and kept them up from possible relegation, with Millwall finishing in a disappointing 15th place.

Final league table

Results
Millwall's score comes first

Legend

Football League Second Division

FA Cup

League Cup

Full Members Cup

Squad

References

Millwall F.C. seasons
Millwall